Halych National Nature Park highlights forest, steppe, meadow and wetlands of the borderlands between the Ukrainian Carpathians and the southwestern part of the East European Plain.  The park lies in the administrative district of Ivano-Frankivsk Raion in Ivano-Frankivsk Oblast in western Ukraine.

Topography
The park is situated in the foothills of the northern slope of the Carpathian Mountains.  The park's territory is a patchwork of 16 tracts along the Dniester River, and up into the hills along several large tributary rivers.

Climate and ecoregion

Flora and fauna
Halych NNP is on the border of two important ecoregions – the Central European mixed forests ecoregion and the Carpathian montane forests ecoregion.  Because of the mixing of flora and fauna in such a transition zone, the park exhibits great biodiversity.  About 70% of the park is forested, and an additional 15% is wetland.  The forest cover is primarily oak-hornbeam and oak-beech.

Public use
The park features extensive trails for hiking and ecological education.  There is a nature museum on the grounds ('The Nature of Galician Earth') in Halych (Galicia-Gora 1).  It has 199 exhibits, including dioramas of local habitats, and displays of over 180 animals.  The park also sponsors an animals rescue center to care for sick or injured wildlife, which the public may visit.  There is a small fee for entry to park, and for use of trails and selected attractions.

See also
 National Parks of Ukraine

References

External links

National parks of Ukraine